Mentzelia eremophila is an uncommon species of flowering plant in the family Loasaceae known by the common names pinyon blazingstar and solitary blazingstar.

Distribution
It is endemic to the Mojave Desert of California, where it grows in sandy scrub and sometimes disturbed areas.

Description

The inflorescence is a cluster of flowers each with five shiny yellow petals one to over two centimeters long.

External links
Jepson Manual Treatment
Photo gallery

eremophila
Endemic flora of California
Flora of the California desert regions
Natural history of the Mojave Desert
Flora without expected TNC conservation status